Bloom is Eric Johnson's fifth studio release, released in June 2005. It was the first studio release since his 1996 album Venus Isle almost nine years prior. However, in these nine years he had released a live album by his side-project Alien Love Child entitled Live and Beyond in 2000, as well as two albums of previously unreleased material: Seven Worlds in 1998 and Souvenir in 2002.

The album is split into three sections, 'Prelude' (tracks 1-6), 'Courante' (tracks 7-12) and 'Allemande' (tracks 13-16). The album was nominated for a Grammy Award in 2006 under the category of Best Pop Instrumental Album.

Track listing
All songs written by Eric Johnson, except where noted.
Prelude
"Bloom" – 3:10
"Summer Jam" – 2:11
"My Back Pages" (Bob Dylan) – 3:47
"Good to Me" – 4:31
"Columbia" – 2:22
"12 to 12 Vibe" – 2:21
Courante
"Sea Secret" – 1:57
"Sad Legacy" – 4:06
"From My Heart" - 7:26
"Cruise the Nile" - 2:13
"Tribute to Jerry Reed" – 2:27
"Your Sweet Eyes" – 6:08
Allemande
"Hesitant" – 6:28
"Sunnaround You" – 3:07
"Magnetized" – 3:21
"Ciel" – 3:26

Personnel
 Eric Johnson - Guitar (Acoustic), Guitar, Guitar (Classical), Piano, Pedal Steel, Composer, Vocals, Producer, Sitar (Electric), Bass, Synth, Rhodes Electric Piano
 Chris Maresh - Bass
 Roscoe Beck - Bass
 Steve Barber - Acoustic Piano, Vocals, Moog Synth
 Bill Maddox - Percussion, Drums
 James Fenner - Percussion
 Tal Bergman - Drums
 Tony Phillips - Drums, Bass, Synth
 Richard Mullen - Engineer
 Tommy Taylor - Percussion, Drums
 Tom Brechtlein - Drums
 Salvatore Banzai La Rocca - Harmonica
 Barry "Frosty" Smith - Drums
 Jody Lazo - Vocals
 Tom Burrit - Percussion
 Adrian Legg - Guitar
 Brad Evilsizer - Percussion
 Shawn Colvin - Vocals
 Rich Harvey - Acoustic Piano
 Lisa Tingle - Vocals

Awards and nominations
Grammy Awards

External links
 Guitar Gardening With Eric Johnson - Bloom Album Review

References

Eric Johnson albums
Favored Nations albums
2005 albums